Anthony Emil Catalano (April 13, 1895 – July 25, 1980) was an Italian-American wrestler, football player and boxer. He played one game in the National Football League (NFL) for the Hammond Pros. Catalano did not attend college.

References

1895 births
1980 deaths
American football guards
Hammond Pros players
Players of American football from Indianapolis